Alcuin was a Carolingian court scholar from York.

Alcuin may also refer to:

 Alcuin Club, an Anglican organization
 Alcuin College, York, a college of the University of York
 Alcuin School, an independent school in Dallas, Texas
 Alcuin Schulten, a Dutch former figure skater
 Alcuin's sequence, a mathematical sequence of coefficients
 Alcuin Society, a non-profit organization founded for the book arts

See also
 Alduin (disambiguation)